Westcombe Park station is in Greenwich, London, and is situated on the Greenwich Line connecting suburbs (e.g.: Deptford, Greenwich, Charlton, Woolwich, to Dartford, Kent) along the south side of the River Thames with central London stations (London Bridge, Cannon Street and Charing Cross).

History 

The station was opened by the South Eastern Railway in 1879, the year after the through line from Greenwich to Maze Hill was finally completed. This connected the original London and Greenwich Railway to the North Kent Line just west of Charlton. The section between Charlton and Maze Hill had opened in 1873, with Maze Hill functioning as a terminus until 1878.

Location 
The station lies at the northern end of a conservation area (Westcombe Park), 5–10 minutes walk down Westcombe Hill from the Blackheath Standard area of Blackheath. It is the closest station to Woodlands House (once the home of John Julius Angerstein and later an art gallery and history archives centre), and is also close to the southern approach to the Blackwall Tunnel, a notorious traffic bottleneck.

Services 

The typical off-peak service in trains per hour is:
 2 tph to London Cannon Street
 2 tph to 
 2 tph to  via 

During the peak hours, the station is served by an additional half-hourly circular service to and from London Cannon Street via  and Lewisham in the clockwise direction and direct to   anticlockwise.

Connections
London Buses routes 108, 286, 335 and 422 serve the station.

References

External links 

Railway stations in the Royal Borough of Greenwich
Former South Eastern Railway (UK) stations
Railway stations in Great Britain opened in 1879
Railway stations served by Southeastern
Railway stations served by Govia Thameslink Railway